Thai Piranthal Vazhi Pirakkum is a 1958 Indian Tamil-language drama film, written directed and produced by A. K. Velan in his directorial debut. The film stars S. S. Rajendran, M. N. Rajam, Prem Nazir, Rajasulochana and V. K. Ramasamy. Released on 14 January 1958, it emerged a major commercial success, and was remade in Telugu as Manchi Manasuku Manchi Rojulu (1958) and in Hindi as Barkha (1959).

Plot 

Chokkanathan is a greed and money obsessed man. He dislikes Rangan as he supports farmers. Marudhi is Rangan's sister. Her marriage gets stopped and Rangan goes to jail because of Chokkanathan. The rest of the story is how Rangan achieves his revenge against Chokkanathan.

Cast 
 S. S. Rajendran as Rangan
 M. N. Rajam as Saradha
 Prem Nazir as Varadhan
 Rajasulochana as Marudhi
V. K. Ramasamy as Chokkanathan
 K. N. Kamalam as Meenakshi, Chokkanathan's wife
 P. S. Venkatachalam as Ekambaram

Production 
Thai Piranthal Vazhi Pirakkum was the directorial debut for the Tamil scholar A. K. Velan, who also produced and wrote it. This was Malayalam actor Prem Nazir's debut film in Tamil language. Cinematography was handled by V. Ramamoorthy, and the editing by V. B. Nadarajan.

Soundtrack 
Music by K. V. Mahadevan and lyrics were written by Kannadasan, A. Maruthakasi, Ku. Sa. Krishnamoorthi, K. Muthuswamy and Suratha. The slow-paced lullaby "Mannukku Maram Baarama" attained popularity, as did the song "Amudhum Thaenum" (Raga: Mohanakalyani). The title track, written by Maruthakasi, is frequently played on Tamil television and radio channels on every Pongal occasion.

Release and reception 

Thai Piranthal Vazhi Pirakkum was released on 14 January 1958, Pongal day. Munuswamy and Manickam jointly reviewed the film for Ananda Vikatan. Munuswamy praised the film for its music and Velan's direction. The film became a commercial success, and Velan built Arunachalam Studio from the profits earned in this film. It also propelled Rajasulochana to stardom. The film was remade in Telugu as Manchi Manasuku Manchi Rojulu (1958) and in Hindi as Barkha (1959).

Notes

References

External links 
 

1950s Tamil-language films
1958 films
Films about poverty in India
Films set in 1958
Indian black-and-white films
1950s musical drama films
Indian musical drama films
Indian satirical films
Films scored by K. V. Mahadevan
Tamil films remade in other languages
1958 directorial debut films
1950s satirical films